Alfred Day Hershey (December 4, 1908 – May 22, 1997) was an American Nobel Prize–winning bacteriologist and geneticist.

He was born in Owosso, Michigan and received his B.S. in chemistry at Michigan State University in 1930 and his Ph.D. in bacteriology in 1934, taking a position shortly thereafter at the Department of Bacteriology at Washington University in St. Louis.

Around 1943, Hershey met bacteriophage researchers Max Delbrück, then at Vanderbilt University, and Salvador Luria at Columbia University.  Hershey became part of their informal network of biologists, known as the Phage group. 
Hershey began performing experiments with bacteriophages with Italian-American Prima Luria, German Max Delbrück, and observed that when two different strains of bacteriophage have infected the same bacteria, the two viruses may exchange genetic information.

In 1950 Hershey married his research partner Martha Chase at Laurel Hollow, New York and joined the Carnegie Institution of Washington's Department of Genetics. There he and his wife Martha Chase performed the famous Hershey–Chase experiment in 1952. This experiment provided additional evidence that DNA, not protein, was the genetic material of life. Notable post-doctoral fellows in Hershey's lab include Anna Marie Skalka.

Hershey became director of the Carnegie Institution (which later became Cold Spring Harbor Laboratory) in 1962 and was awarded the Nobel Prize in Physiology or Medicine in 1969, shared with Salvador Luria and Max Delbrück for their discovery on the replication of viruses and their genetic structure.*

Hershey officially retired in 1970, but lived on the grounds of the Cold Spring Harbor Laboratory for the rest of his life. In 1971, he edited The Bacteriophage λ, an extensive volume on the subject, published by Cold Spring Harbor.

In 1981, Hershey became a founding member of the World Cultural Council.

Hershey had one child, Peter Manning Hershey (1956-1999) with his wife Harriet Davidson (1918-2000).  The family was active in the social network of Cold Spring Harbor Laboratory and regularly enjoyed the beach in season. Hershey was a Christian. Hershey died from congestive heart failure on 22 May 1997 at his home in Syosset, New York, at 88 years old. 

After Hershey died, another phage worker, Frank Stahl, wrote: "The Phage Church, as we were sometimes called (see Phage group), was led by the Trinity of Delbrück, Luria, and Hershey. Delbrück's status as founder and his ex cathedra manner made him the pope, of course, and Luria was the hard-working, socially sensitive priest-confessor. And Al (Hershey) was the saint."

References

External links
 
 Key Participants: Alfred D. Hershey - Linus Pauling and the Race for DNA: A Documentary History

1908 births
1997 deaths
20th-century American chemists
American geneticists
American Nobel laureates
Founding members of the World Cultural Council
History of genetics
Phage workers
Michigan State University alumni
Nobel laureates in Physiology or Medicine
People from Cold Spring Harbor, New York
People from Owosso, Michigan
Recipients of the Albert Lasker Award for Basic Medical Research
Washington University in St. Louis faculty
Nobel laureates affiliated with Missouri
People from Syosset, New York
Members of the United States National Academy of Sciences
Scientists from New York (state)
Washington University School of Medicine faculty